Barr-Reeve Junior/Senior High School is a public secondary school located in Montgomery, Indiana, United States. It serves grades K-12 for the Barr-Reeve Community Schools.

History

The school is a consolidation of Alfordsville and Montgomery High Schools, opening in 1965. Alfordsville High School opened in 1922, with its original mascot being the Yellow Jacket. Montgomery High School, on the other hand, opened 10 years earlier in 1912. In 1957, the then Montgomery High School, now Barr-Reeve High School, experienced a fire, destroying the whole school except for the colloquially named "old gym." In late 2020, Barr-Reeve High School finished construction, adding a new gym, classrooms, and a larger, newer, parking lot.

Academics
Barr-Reeve ranked 111th in Indiana and 5,239th nationally in the 2020 U.S. News & World Report annual survey of high schools.

Demographics
The demographic breakdown of the 443 students enrolled for 2018-19 was:
Male - 48.1%
Female - 51.9%
Asian - 0.5%
Hispanic - 1.4%
White - 96.8%
Multiracial - 1.4%
42.9% of the students were eligible for free or reduced-cost lunch. For 2018-19, Barr-Reeve was a Title I school.

Athletics
Barr-Reeve's Vikings compete in the Blue Chip Conference. School colors are black, white and red. The following Indiana High School Athletic Association (IHSAA) sanctioned sports were offered for 2019-20:

Baseball (boys) 
Basketball (girls and boys) 
Cross country (girls and boys) 
Individual State Champion - Connor Sorrells - 2012
Golf (girls and boys) 
Softball (girls) 
Tennis (girls and boys) 
Track (girls and boys) 
Volleyball (girls)

See also
 List of high schools in Indiana

References

External links

High schools in Southwestern Indiana
Educational institutions established in 1965
Public middle schools in Indiana
Public high schools in Indiana
Blue Chip Conference
Schools in Daviess County, Indiana
1965 establishments in Indiana